Rang Birangi (colorful) is a 1983 Hindi film, based on a story by the Hindi writer Kamleshwar, and directed by Hrishikesh Mukherjee. This comedy classic is most remembered for the Utpal Dutt's role of ACP Dhurandhar Bhatawdekar, which won him the Filmfare Best Comedian Award for the year.

Synopsis
Ajay Sharma is a very successful entrepreneur who has now transformed into a workaholic and is seen ignoring his wife of seven years, Nirmala. Enter Ravi Kapoor, a friend of Ajay notices Nirmala's loneliness and decides to fix things by rekindling the spark in their life. Thus starts a hilarious comedy involving Ajay's secretary, Anita and her boyfriend, Jeet and a re-enactment of Pati, Patni aur Woh.

Cast
 Amol Palekar as Ajay Sharma
 Parveen Babi as Nirmala Sharma
 Farooque Shaikh as Prof. Jeet Saxena
 Deepti Naval as Anita Sood
 Utpal Dutt as Police Inspector Dhurandhar Bhatawdekar 
 Deven Verma as Ravi Kapoor
 Javed Khan
 Om Prakash Retired Judge
 Chhayadevi Mrs.Banerjee
 Raj Babbar (Guest Appearance)
 Bindiya Goswami (Guest Appearance)
 Amol Sen as Havaldar
 Poonam as Neema's sister

Soundtrack

Awards

|-
| 1984
| Utpal Dutt
| Filmfare Award for Best Performance in a Comic Role
| 
|}

References

External links
 
 Rang Birangi at Bollywood Hungama

1983 comedy films
1980s Hindi-language films
1983 films
Films scored by R. D. Burman
Films directed by Hrishikesh Mukherjee
Films about Bollywood